Giovanni Haag (born 20 May 2000) is a French professional footballer who plays as a midfielder for  club Nancy.

Career
Haag made his professional debut with Nancy in a 1–0 Ligue 2 win over Red Star on 23 November 2018.

Personal life
Haag is of Italian descent through his mother, who died when he was 15 years old.

References

External links
 
 LFP Profile

2000 births
Living people
Footballers from Metz
French footballers
French people of Italian descent
Association football midfielders
Ligue 2 players
Championnat National players
Championnat National 3 players
AS Nancy Lorraine players
Gazélec Ajaccio players